Steve Videtich (born November 4, 1971) was the general manager of the Arena Football League's Utah Blaze. He used to be a placekicker  for the Blaze. He has played for the Florida Bobcats, the New Jersey Red Dogs/New Jersey Gladiators/Las Vegas Gladiators, the Milwaukee Mustangs, and the Columbus Destroyers.

He is married to his wife Carolyn and has two children, Tessa and Emelia.

Professional

2008
Videtich was released March 5 after missing a game-winning field goal against the Arizona Rattlers

2007
Videtich played in all 16 games for the Blaze where he connected on 10-of-19 field goal attempts and 113-of-127 PATs.

2006

Videtich joined the Blaze for their inaugural season. During the season, Videtich became the all-time leader in kicking points with 1,381 career points, while setting two new expansion marks for PATs attempted (113) and made (106).

2004-2005
Videtich played for the Columbus Destroyers where he connected on 14-of-28 field goal attempts and 92-of-99 extra point attempts, including one by drop kick (which was worth two points as per AFL rules). Videtich ranked third in the league among kickers with 134 points scored that season. He is one of only two kickers (Brian Mitchell being the other) to have ever scored points with the drop kick in the AFL.

2001-2003
While playing for the New Jersey/Las Vegas Gladiators, Videtich was named Second-Team All-Arena in 2003.

2000
He played one season for the Milwaukee Mustangs.

1997-1999
Videtich played two seasons for the New Jersey Red Dogs. In 1997, Videtich was named Kicker of Year for setting a league record by converting 60 consecutive extra-point attempts; a streak that extended into the 1998 season; the streak would reach 62 before being snapped.

1996
Videtich began his career in the AFL with the Florida Bobcats. He also went to training camp with the Washington Redskins of the National Football League in 1996.

College
Videtich played college football for North Carolina State and was one of the nation’s most accurate kickers over his last two collegiate seasons (1993–1994), connecting on 28-of-31 field goals. He finished his collegiate career second in the Wolfpack record books in field goal percentage. Videtich was named Second-Team All-American at NC State in 1994 and his team was All-ACC in ’93 and ’94.

High school years
Videtich attended Ledford Senior High School and was a student and a letterman in football, soccer, and golf.

Personal
Videtich is regarded as one of the AFL’s top kickers. Videtich was a three sport athlete at Ledford Senior High School in Thomasville, North Carolina, and holds three school records. He was a four-time soccer MVP in high school on a team coached by his father, Tom. He majored in industrial engineering at North Carolina State University. Videtich and his wife, Carolyn, have two children: Tessa and Emelia. When Videtich’s isn’t playing football, he enjoys golfing and watching college football.

Awards
Kicker of the Year - 1997, 2002
First-Team All-Arena - 1997, 2002
Second-Team All-Arena - 1998, 2000, 2003

References

External links
Stats from arenafan.com

1971 births
Living people
American football placekickers
NC State Wolfpack football players
Florida Bobcats players
New Jersey Red Dogs players
Milwaukee Mustangs (1994–2001) players
New Jersey Gladiators players
Las Vegas Gladiators players
Columbus Destroyers players
Utah Blaze players
Players of American football from Winston-Salem, North Carolina